Fabio Ramón "Pitu" Ramos (born 14 June 1980) is a Paraguayan football attacking midfielder, for Torneo Descentralizado club Real Garcilaso.

Ramos started his career in Nacional of Asunción before signing to Portuguese side Rio Ave F.C. in 1998. Ramos returned to Paraguay in 2003 to play again for Nacional. In 2007, he was the Paraguayan 1st division topscorer along with Pablo Zeballos, netting 15 goals for Nacional of Paraguay.

He was transferred in the 2009 season to Ecuadorian giants Emelec. In 2010, he joined Argentine Primera B Nacional (second division) side Atlético Tucumán.
In 2012 Fabio play for Real Garcilaso.

External links
 
 Fabio Ramos at BDFA.com.ar 
 

1980 births
Living people
Paraguayan footballers
Club Nacional footballers
Paraguay international footballers
Paraguayan expatriate footballers
C.S. Emelec footballers
Atlético Tucumán footballers
Expatriate footballers in Argentina
Expatriate footballers in Portugal
Expatriate footballers in Ecuador
Expatriate footballers in Peru
Paraguayan expatriate sportspeople in Portugal
People from Areguá
Association football midfielders